Dhātus (dhä·tōōs), n.pl. ( from Sanskrit धातु dhātu - layer, stratum, constituent part, ingredient, element, primitive matter ) in Ayurveda, the seven fundamental principles (elements) that support the basic structure (and functioning) of the body.

They consist of:
 Rasa dhatu (lymph)
 Rakta dhatu (blood)
 Mamsa dhatu (muscles)
 Medha dhatu (fat)
 Asthi dhatu (bone)
 Majja dhatu (marrow (bone and spinal))
 Shukra dhatu (semen)

Traditional texts often refer to these as the Seven Dhātus (Saptadhātus). Ojas, meaning vigour or vitality, is known as the eighth Dhātu, or Mahādhātu (superior, or great dhātu).

See also

Dhātu (disambiguation) - a Buddhist technical term or a stupa, Pāli thūpa.

References

External links
 The Dhatus

Ayurveda
Hindu philosophical concepts